Klaudia Wojtunik (born 15 May 1999) is a Polish athlete specialising in the sprint hurdles. She won a bronze medal at the 2021 European U23 Championships.

Her personal bests are 12.97 seconds in the 100 metres hurdles (-0.9 m/s, Tallinn 2021) and 8.07 seconds in the 60 metres hurdles (Toruń 2022).

International competitions

References

1999 births
Living people
Polish female hurdlers